Shin Hyun-ji (born 14 March 1996) is a South Korean fashion model. After winning Korea's Next Top Model, Shin appeared on the cover of international Vogue editions.

Career 

Shin's mother enrolled her in a modeling academy and she began her career on Korea's Next Top Model; had she not become a model she would've considered a career as an architect. After winning the fourth season of Top Model, besting fellow model HoYeon Jung, she signed with IMG Models. Internationally, Shin began her career in Sydney, Australia, before walking for Coach at New York City's Hudson Yards building. She appeared in 30 fashion shows during her first season, such as Chanel, Prada, Jacquemus, Burberry, Dries van Noten, Miu Miu, Jil Sander, Isabel Marant, DKNY, 3.1 Philip Lim, Rodarte, and Marc Jacobs. Shortly before his 2019 death, Shin was photographed by Karl Lagerfeld for what would ultimately become his final Chanel campaign. She also appeared in the F/W 2019 fashion show, which became a tribute to him. Her other career highlights with the Chanel brand include closing its F/W 2020 show alongside American model Gigi Hadid and Danish model Mona Tougaard. In 2020, she walked in 20 shows for designers including Salvatore Ferragamo, Tory Burch, Louis Vuitton, and Yves Saint Laurent.

Shin has appeared on the cover of CR Fashion Book, and Asian editions of W and Vogue among others. She has also been featured in a Zara summer advertisement.

In addition to ranking on models.com's "Top 50" list, she was chosen as a "Top Newcomer" for the S/S 2016 season, and was nominated as a "Breakout Star" for their 2018 Model of the Year Awards. Shin says her ultimate goal is to model for decades and she would like to have the longevity of models like Kate Moss, Lauren Hutton, and Cindy Crawford.

References 

Living people
1996 births
South Korean female models
IMG Models models
Next Top Model winners
Models from Seoul